Reich is a German surname that may refer to:
 Béla Rajki-Reich (1909–2000), Hungarian swimming coach and water polo coach
 Charles A. Reich (1928–2019), American professor of law and writer
 Christopher Reich (born 1961), American author
 David Reich (disambiguation), multiple people
 Eli Thomas Reich (1913–1999), Vice-Admiral of the US Navy
 Ferdinand Reich (1799–1882), German chemist
 Frank Reich (born 1961), American football player and coach
 Günter Reich (1921–1989), German-Israeli baritone
 Herman Reich (1917–2009), American baseball player and manager
 Jens Reich (born 1939), German scientist and civil rights campaigner
 Jeremy Reich (born 1979), Canadian ice hockey player
 Leon Reich (1879–1929), Polish lawyer and politician
 Lilly Reich (1885–1947), German modernist designer
 Marcel Reich-Ranicki (1920–2013), German literary critic
 Marco Reich (born 1977), German association football player
 Michael Reich (born 1945), Polish-born economist 
 Otto Reich (born 1945), Cuban-American diplomat
 Robert Reich (born 1946), American political commentator, college professor, and former Secretary of Labor
 Sam Reich (born 1984), American producer, director, writer, actor, and performer
 Sarah Reich (born 1989), American tap dance instructor, choreographer and performer
 Stephen C. Reich (1971–2005), American soldier and Minor League Baseball player
 Steve Reich (born 1936), American composer of classical music
 Steven Reich, American attorney
 Wilhelm Reich (1897–1957), Austrian-American psychiatrist, psychoanalyst and founder of orgonomy
 Zinaida Reich (1894–1939), Russian actress 

People with surnames derived from Reich:
 Anton Reicha (1770–1836), Czech composer
 Irma Reichová (1859–1930), Czech operatic soprano
 Kathy Reichs (born 1948), American crime writer, forensic anthropologist and academic

See also
 Reicher (disambiguation)

German-language surnames